Forever Faithless – The Greatest Hits is a greatest hits compilation album from the dance music group Faithless, which was released on 16 May 2005. It features all their released singles (other than "Take the Long Way Home"), plus three additional new tracks ("Fatty Boo", "Reasons (Saturday Night)", and "Why Go?" (2005 remix featuring Estelle).

Chart performance
Forever Faithless was the best selling dance album of 2005. It has sold 1,381,407 copies as of October 2015. After the death of Faithless member Maxi Jazz in December 2022, Forever Faithless entered the UK Album Downloads Chart at number 7.

Track listing

UK version

US version
Released on Arista Records, the American version of the Forever Faithless CD does not include "Fatty Boo", but is an enhanced disc with a bonus music video of the 2005 version of "Why Go".

Initial US pressings contained MediaMax CD-3 copy protection, but this was abandoned after the 2005 Sony BMG CD copy protection scandal.

Song versions
Except "Insomnia" and "Salva Mea", the chart versions of each song are included, not the full-length versions. This was necessary to fit all the tracks into 1 hour 20 minutes.

Charts

Weekly charts

Year-end charts

Certifications

DVD

Alongside the CD a DVD was also released containing the promotional videos for 12 Faithless singles, but does not include the videos for "Salva Mea '95", "Reverence", "If Lovin' You Is Wrong", "Bring My Family Back" (German version featuring Sabrina Setlur), "Why Go?" (Boy George Version), "Why Go?" (Estelle Version), "Muhammad Ali" (Rollo & Sister Bliss Tuff Love Mix Video) and "Miss U Less, See U More".

Track listing

References

External links
 
 Official site

2005 greatest hits albums
Faithless albums
Faithless video albums
2005 video albums
Music video compilation albums
Cheeky Records compilation albums
Cheeky Records video albums
Albums produced by Rollo Armstrong